Derryth Lynne Thomas (born 29 September 1939) is a Welsh former cricketer who played as a right-handed batter and right-arm off break bowler. She appeared in 10 Test matches and 12 One Day Internationals for England between 1966 and 1979. She also played 12 matches for, and was captain of, International XI at the 1982 World Cup. She played domestic cricket for West of England.

She opened the batting for England when they won the 1973 World Cup, and, against International XI in England's opening game of the tournament, became the first woman to score a century in one-day international cricket. In the same match, along with Enid Bakewell, Thomas set the record for the highest opening partnership in Women's Cricket World Cup history (246).

She also played hockey at international level for Wales. She was a full-time P.E. teacher at Neath Girls' Grammar School.

References

External links
 

1939 births
Living people
Cricketers from Llanelli
England women Test cricketers
England women One Day International cricketers
International XI women cricket captains
International XI women One Day International cricketers
West women cricketers
Welsh women cricketers
Women cricketers who made a century on One Day International debut